Asaduzzaman Mia (born 14 August 1960) is a retired police officer who served as the 33rd Police commissioner of Dhaka Metropolitan Police, the longest serving commissioner and the incumbent chief executive officer of National Security Affairs Cell under the Cabinet Division. During his tenure as DMP Commissioner, Dhaka Metropolitan Police was considered to be at its peak.

Early life
Mia was born on 14 August 1960 at Alfadanga in Faridpur District of the then East Pakistan (now Bangladesh). After completing his Master's, he joined the Bangladesh Police force as an Assistant Police Superintendent on 15 February 1988.

Career
Mia served in Chittagong Railway Police in 2001. He was then transferred to Syedpur Railway Police. He was then transferred to the Armed Police Battalion in Bogra District. He served at the Police Training Center in Noakhali District. During the 2001 to 2006 Bangladesh Nationalist Party government rule, Mia was discriminated in promotion along with other police officers from Faridpur District, Gopalganj District, and Hindu officers as they were perceived to be supporters of Awami League.

Mia served as the superintendent of police in Sunamganj, Pabna, Tangail, Chittagong and Saidpur. He was the CO of the first Armed Police Battalion in Bogra. He was the additional deputy inspector general and commandant of Noakhali Police Training Center. He also served in Khulna, Chittagong, Dhaka and highway range as a DIG. He was promoted to additional inspector general of police in December 2015.

Mia was the 33rd Commissioner of Dhaka Metropolitan Police served from 7 January 2015 to 13 September 2019. It was during his tenure the July 2016 Dhaka attack took place.

Holey Artisan

During the Holey Artisan Attack, DMP Commissioner, Asaduzzaman Mia, and several officers struck inside and opened fire on the militants in an attempt to rescue civilians from the site. 9 people were brought back from the site in the attempt. Prime Minister Sheikh Hasina was briefed by the Commissioner and she instructed him to move away with his men and informed him the Army Chief Belal Shafiul Huq was on his way from Sylhet. He has been known as one of the figurehead who contributed in uprooting terrorism from the country.

During his tenure as the DMP Commissioner, arrests without warrants was brought down by 99%, general diary (GD) format was introduced in every police station, an e-traffic prosecution system was introduced and information of Dhaka residents was stored on a digital database to reduce crimes.

He banned run down transport vehicles called Laguna in Dhaka. In August 2019, the government cancelled his retirement and extended his term in office. His tenure at Dhaka Metropolitan Police was extended by one month.

Mia was made the Chief Executive Officer of the newly formed National Security Affairs Cell on 14 September 2019. He described the actions of Harun-or-Rashid, slapping a fellow police officer, as an unprofessional & severe breach of the code of conduct.

References 

1960 births
Living people
Bangladeshi police officers
People from Faridpur District